Saint Mary Parish or Saint Mary's Parish may refer to:

Administrative parishes 
 Saint Mary Parish, Antigua and Barbuda
 Sainte-Marie Parish, New Brunswick, Canada, in Kent County
 Saint Marys Parish, New Brunswick, Canada, in York County
 Saint Mary Parish, Jamaica
 St. Mary Parish, Louisiana, United States

Ecclesiastic parishes 
 Saint Mary's Parish (Red Bluff, California), United States
 St. Mary Parish, Torrington, Connecticut, United States
 St. Mary Parish (Bridgeport, Connecticut), United States
 St. Mary Parish (Newington, Connecticut), United States
 St. Mary Parish, Ware, Massachusetts, United States
 St. Mary's Parish (Bridgeton, Missouri), United States
 St. Mary's Parish (Appleton, Wisconsin), United States

See also
 Saint Mary (disambiguation)

Parish name disambiguation pages